Christopher Edward Goudge (4 March 1935 Prestwich, Greater Manchester, England– 7 November 2010 Devon, United Kingdom) was a British athlete who competed in the  400m hurdles at the 1960 Summer Olympic Games in Rome.

Early life
Goudge was born in Prestwich, Greater Manchester, England where his father was an inspector for Lloyds Bank. The family settled in Bolton where he attended Bolton School. While doing national service with the Royal Tank Regiment he also represented them as a runner. He studied physics at UMIST, also playing clarinet and representing the University in athletics.

Sporting career
He joined Bolton Harriers running club and achieved early success in the high jump, winning the senior Lancashire event while still a junior. He also became successful as a runner and hurdler; in 1957 he was a member of the silver medal-winning British team in the 4x400m relay at the World Student Games and the following year he represented England at the Cardiff Commonwealth Games in the 440m hurdles. He held the English record for this title between 1958 and 1964, also being selected to compete in the 400m hurdles at the 1960 Rome Olympics. He ran 52.6 in the third heat, finishing fourth, which turned out to be insufficient to qualify him for the semifinals.

Post-Olympics and legacy
Goudge and his wife Elizabeth had two children, Caroline and Jonathan. The rest of his life was spent teaching physics until his retirement in 1995, when he moved to Devon. He is commemorated in Bolton as part of the "Spirit of Sport" statue on De Havilland Way.

References

1935 births
2010 deaths
People educated at Bolton School
British male hurdlers
Olympic athletes of Great Britain
Athletes (track and field) at the 1960 Summer Olympics
Commonwealth Games competitors for England
Athletes (track and field) at the 1958 British Empire and Commonwealth Games
Alumni of the University of Manchester Institute of Science and Technology